Stefanina is a village and a community of the Volvi municipality. Before the 2011 local government reform it was part of the municipality of Arethousa, of which it was a municipal district. The 2011 census recorded 362 inhabitants in the village and 381 in the community. The community of Stefanina covers an area of 55.996 km2.

Administrative division
The community of Stefanina consists of two separate settlements: 
Kato Stefanina (population 19)
Stefanina (population 362)
The aforementioned population figures are from the 2011 census.

See also
 List of settlements in the Thessaloniki regional unit

References

Populated places in Thessaloniki (regional unit)